The American British Academy (later renamed ABA - An IB World School, or simply ABA), established in September 1987, is a private, non-profit, co-educational international school in Muscat, Oman. It offers a K-12 English-language curriculum to expatriate students. ABA is an International Baccalaureate World Continuum School, which enrolls 950 students from pre-kindergarten to grade 12 from more than 75 countries. ABA is the first school in the region to offer the IB programme — PYP, MYP and the IB DP.

References

External links
School website

1987 establishments in Oman
Educational institutions established in 1987
International Baccalaureate schools
International schools in Oman
British international schools in Asia
American international schools in Asia
Schools in Muscat, Oman
Private schools in Oman